Lolo et Sucette (translation: Lolo and Sucette) is a Belgian gag-a-day comics series by Marc Hardy and Yann about two prostitutes.

Concept

Lolo et Sucette is a one-page gag comic about two prostitutes and the various customers they have. Lolo is an obese blonde woman, while Sucette is red-headed and slender. Both are chain smokers. In 1988 the series debuted in the Belgian magazine Circus in a magazine special about prostitution. The characters caught on and soon received their own series. The first album was published by Glénat, but in 1997 it was distributed by Dupuis in their Humour Libre collection.

Albums
 Trottoirs Brûlants (1989), Glénat.
 Vénus Vénales (1997), Dupuis.
 Tapinage Artistique (1998), Dupuis.
 Coïts et Chuchotements (1999), Dupuis.
 Macadam Cochonnes (2000), Dupuis.
 Au Suivant! (2001), Dupuis.

Sources

External links
 http://www.bedetheque.com/serie-1188-BD-Lolo-et-Sucette.html

Belgian comic strips
Gag-a-day comics
Erotic comics
1988 comics debuts
2001 comics endings
Comic strip duos
Fictional prostitutes
Prostitution in comics
Fictional Belgian people
Comics about women
Female characters in comics
Belgian comics characters
Dupuis titles
Fictional characters from Wallonia
Works set in Wallonia